Jess Lawson Peacey (18 February 1885 – 29 June 1965) was a British sculptor. Her work was part of the sculpture event in the art competition at the 1932 Summer Olympics.

References

1885 births
1965 deaths
20th-century British sculptors
British women sculptors
Olympic competitors in art competitions
Artists from Edinburgh